Curetis freda, the parallel sunbeam, is a species of butterfly in the lycaenid subfamily Curetinae. It was described by John Nevill Eliot in 1959. Its type locality is the Malay Peninsula. The species also occurs on Borneo and Sumatra, and in the Yala Province of Thailand.

References

Curetis
Butterflies of Asia
Butterflies described in 1959